Palestine (1947–1974) was a British Thoroughbred racehorse. Owned and bred by Aga Khan III he was out of the mare Una and sired by Fair Trial.

Trained by Marcus Marsh and ridden by Charlie Smirke, Palestine was the winner of the 2000 Guineas in 1950. In all he won eleven of his thirteen outings.

Palestine retired to stud in 1951 and in 1964 was the leading Irish sire of two-year-olds and put down due to old age on 10 July 1974.

His son Pakistan II, (1958-1972), was the champion stallion sire in New Zealand in the 1969-70, 1971-72, 1972-73 and 1974-75 seasons.

References

1947 racehorse births
1974 racehorse deaths
Thoroughbred family 3-e
Racehorses bred in the United Kingdom
Racehorses trained in the United Kingdom
2000 Guineas winners